The 2007 Asian Wrestling Championships were held in Bishkek, Kyrgyzstan. The event took place from May 8 to May 13, 2007.

Medal table

Team ranking

Medal summary

Men's freestyle

Men's Greco-Roman

Women's freestyle

Participating nations 
207 competitors from 19 nations competed.

 (21)
 (4)
 (14)
 (14)
 (4)
 (21)
 (2)
 (20)
 (21)
 (13)
 (6)
 (2)
 (4)
 (20)
 (6)
 (4)
 (8)
 (4)
 (19)

References
Results

External links
UWW Database

Asia
W
Asian Wrestling Championships
W
Wrestling in Kyrgyzstan
Sport in Bishkek